Karol Mikuli, often seen as Charles Mikuli ( or Կարոլ Պստիկյան; 22 October 1821 – 21 May 1897) was a Polish pianist, composer, conductor and teacher. His students included Moriz Rosenthal, Raoul Koczalski, Aleksander Michałowski, Jaroslaw Zieliński, Kornelia Parnas and Heinrich Schenker.

Biographical notes 
Mikuli (birth surname Bsdikian) was born on October 22, 1821, in Czernwitz, then part of the Austrian Empire (today Chernivtsi, Ukraine) to a Moldavian-Armenian family. He studied under Frédéric Chopin for piano (later becoming his teaching assistant) and Anton Reicha for composition.  He toured widely as a concert pianist, becoming Director of the Lviv Conservatory in 1858.  He founded his own school there in 1888. He died in Lemberg, then part of Austrian Galicia (today Lviv, Ukraine) and is buried in Lychakiv Cemetery in Lviv.

Editions 

He is most well known as an editor of works by Chopin. Dover Publications currently publishes reprints of his 1879 editions of Chopin's piano music, originally published by F. Kistner (Leipzig). His goal, as stated in the foreword of the edition, was to provide more reliable editions. He used several verified sources, most of which were written or corrected by Chopin himself. His editions of Chopin's works were first published in America in 1895.

Mikuli also took detailed notes of Chopin's comments made in lessons and interviewed witnesses of Chopin's performances. For many years he was regarded as the primary authority on Chopin and his remarks about Chopin's playing were often quoted by biographers.

Musical works 

Orchestral
 48 Airs nationaux roumains for orchestra, also arr. piano.

Chamber music
 Polonaise for 3 violins, Op. 7 (published 1862)
 Serenade in A major for clarinet and piano, Op. 22 (1880) (Romanian: Serenadă pentru clarinet și pian, Op. 22)
 Scherzino in C minor for 3 violins, Op. 25 (1880)
 Grand duo in A major for violin and piano, Op. 26

Piano
 Prélude et presto agitato, Op. 1 (published 1859)
 4 Mazurkas, Op. 2 (1860)
 Mazurka in F minor, Op. 4 (1860)
 2 Polonaises, Op. 8 (1862)
 48 Airs nationaux roumains (Ballades, chants des bergers, airs de danse, etc.) in 4 volumes (1863)
 6 Pièces, Op. 9 (published 1866 by Spina in Vienna)
 Mazurka, Op. 10 (1866)
 Mazurka in B minor, Op. 11 (1866)
 Étude in B major for piano with harmonium, Op. 12 (1867)
 6 Danses allemandes, Op. 13 (1867)
 Méditation, Op. 14 (1867)
 Andante con Variazioni for piano 4-hands, Op. 15 (1867)
 6 Valses, Op. 18 (1869)
 2 Nocturnes, Op. 19 (1869)
 Valse in A major, Op. 20 (1869)
 Ballade in B major, Op. 21 (1871)
 12 Variantes (Variations) harmoniques sur la gamme d'Ut majeure for piano 4-hands, Op. 23 (1880); published by Kistner (Leipzig)
 10 Pièces, Op. 24 (1880)

Vocal
 6 Lieder for voice and piano, Op. 16 (1867)
 6 Lieder for voice and piano, Op. 17 (1867)
 7 Lieder for voice and piano, Op. 27 (1880)
 2 Duette for soprano, tenor and piano, Op. 28 (1880)
 Die Reue: „Die Nacht war schwarz“ for baritone and string orchestra, Op. 30 (1880)

Choral
 7 Lieder for soprano, alto, tenor and bass, Op. 17 (1880)
 Paraphrase sur un ancien Chant de Noël polonais for 4 voices (solo and chorus), strings and organ (or piano 4-hands), Op. 31 (1881)
 2 Spiritual Songs for male chorus and soli, Op. 32
 Veni creator for mixed chorus and organ, Op. 33

Recordings 
 Şahan Arzruni: An Anthology of Armenian Piano Music, Vol I, Musical Heritage Society - MHS 4080.

References

External links 

 
 Charles (Carl, Karol) MIKULI (1821-1897) L'élève arménien de Frédéric Chopin à Paris et son éditeur en Podolie-Galicie
 Chopin as Pianist and Teacher Excerpt from the forward to his edition of Chopin's works for publisher F. Kistner, 1879
 Scores by Karol Mikuli in digital library Polona

19th-century Austrian musicians
Polish classical pianists
Polish composers
Polish Romantic composers
Romanian classical pianists
Romanian classical composers
Austrian classical pianists
Male classical pianists
Austrian classical composers
Pupils of Frédéric Chopin
People from the Kingdom of Galicia and Lodomeria
Musicians from Chernivtsi
Polish Austro-Hungarians
Polish people of Romanian descent
Polish people of Armenian descent
1821 births
1897 deaths
Academic staff of Lviv Conservatory
19th-century classical composers
19th-century classical pianists
19th-century Polish musicians
19th-century male musicians